Steele may refer to:

Places

America
 Steele, Alabama, a town
 Steele, Arkansas, an unincorporated community
 Steele, Kentucky, an unincorporated community
 Steele, Missouri, a city
 Lonetree, Montana, a ghost town originally called Steele
 Steele, North Dakota, a city
 Steele City, Nebraska
 Steele County, Minnesota
 Steele County, North Dakota
 Steele Butte, a summit in Utah

Others
 Steele Township (disambiguation)
 Steele, Essen, a suburb of Essen, Germany

Canada
 Steele Lake (Alberta), Canada
 Mount Steele, Yukon, Canada
 Steeles Avenue, a street in Ontario

Antarctica
 Mount Steele (Antarctica)
 Steele Island, Palmer Land, Antarctica

People
 Steele (surname), a list of people with the name
 Steele (given name), a list of people
 Steele (rapper)
 Sean Morley (born 1971) pro-wrestler who wrestled under the stagename "el Steele"

Other uses
 USS Steele (DE-8), a World War II destroyer escort
 Steele (supercomputer), at Purdue University
 Steele Prize, awards given by the American Mathematical Society
 Steele baronets, an extinct title in the Baronetage of Ireland
 Steele Barracks (disambiguation)
 Steele House (disambiguation), various houses on the US National Register of Historic Places

See also
 Fort Steele, British Columbia, Canada, a heritage town
 Steel (disambiguation)
 Steal (disambiguation)
 Justice Steele (disambiguation)
 Stele